Afdera jimenae is a moth in the family Oecophoridae. It was described by Ogden and Parra in 2001. It is found in Chile, where it has been recorded from the Peninsula of Hualpén.

The wingspan is 13–16 mm for males and 15–18 mm for females. Both the fore- and hindwings are dark brown. Adults are on wing from October to December in one generation per year.

The larvae feed on fallen leaves of various species of plants, including Cryptocarya alba, Aextoxicon punctatum, Peumus boldus and Lithrea caustica.

Etymology
The species name is dedicated to Jimena C. Ogden, spouse of T. Ogden, one of the authors.

References

Moths described in 2001
Depressariinae
Endemic fauna of Chile